Muteb Al-Mufarrij (born 19 August 1996) is a Saudi Arabian football player who plays as a centre back for Al-Hilal in the Saudi Professional League, and the Saudi Arabia national team.

Career statistics

Club

Honours

Al-Hilal
Saudi Professional League: 2017–18, 2020–21, 2021–22
Kings Cup: 2019–20
AFC Champions League: 2021
Saudi Super Cup: 2018, 2021

Al-Taawoun
Kings Cup: 2019

References

External links
 
 

1996 births
Living people
Saudi Arabian footballers
Saudi Arabia international footballers
Saudi Arabia youth international footballers
Association football defenders
Saudi Professional League players
Al Hilal SFC players
Al-Taawoun FC players
Al-Shabab FC (Riyadh) players
Sportspeople from Riyadh